SDS-4 (Small Demonstration Satellite 4) is a small satellite (50 cm cube with mass of 50 kg) developed by JAXA.  It was launched as a secondary payload on the Shizuku mission on 17 May 2012 UTC.

In 2019, its ownership was transferred to the SKY Perfect JSAT Corporation (JSAT). Operation was terminated by the end of June 2021.

There are four rather specialised systems on the satellite:

 SPAISE (SPace-based Automatic Identification SystEm) - test on-orbit a receiver for picking up signals from Automatic Identification System transmitters on ships well out to sea, and determine how space-based reception is affected by interference between nearby transmitters and by environmental conditions.
 FOX (Flat heat-pipe on-orbit experiment) - to test whether flat heat pipes work in space in accordance with theoretical models and with tests on Earth
 IST (In-flight experiment of Solar absorption rate with THERME) - to acquire information about the effect of sunlight in space on thermal coatings, re-flying the THERME instrument developed by CNES for testing different thermal coatings 
 QCM (Quartz Crystal Microbalance) - to test whether a Japanese-manufactured quartz microbalance works well in monitoring contamination of the satellite from assembly to on-orbit operation.

References 

Spacecraft launched in 2012
Satellites of Japan
Spacecraft launched by H-II rockets